Abbasian Wala is a small village located in Union council Haitu in Kalurkot Tehsil  Bhakkar District, Punjab, Pakistan.

References

Villages in Bhakkar District